Aram (Armenian: Արարատեան) is an Armenian origin word which is used as a surname. People with the surname include:

 Abbas Aram (1906–1985), Iranian diplomat and politician
 Colette Aram (1967–1983), British trainee hairdresser
 Eugene Aram (1704–1759), English philologist and murderer
 Hur Aram (born 1971), South Korean writer
 Kamrooz Aram (born 1978), Iranian American artist 
 M. Aram (1927–1997), Indian educator and peace advocate
 Siegfried Aram (1891–1978), German lawyer and cultural politician
 Zeev Aram (1931–2021), British furniture and interior designer

See also
 Aram (given name)
 Aram (disambiguation)

Armenian-language surnames
Armenian words and phrases